Great Britain (specifically known as Great Britain and Northern Ireland), the team of the British Olympic Association (BOA) which represents the United Kingdom, is scheduled to compete at the 2024 Summer Olympics in Paris from 26 July to 11 August 2024. British athletes have appeared in every Summer Olympic Games of the modern era, alongside Australia, France, Greece, and Switzerland.

Administration
On 17 March 2022, the British Olympic Association announced that Mark England would be the team's chef de mission in Paris, following his success in the role at the two previous Games in Rio de Janeiro and Tokyo, where Great Britain won 67 and 64 medals respectively.

Competitors
The following is the number of qualifying places so far secured at the Games.

Athletics

British track and field athletes achieved the entry standards for Paris 2024, either by passing the direct qualifying mark (or time for track and road races) or by world ranking, in the following events (a maximum of 3 athletes each):

Track and road events

Equestrian

Great Britain entered a full squad of equestrian riders each to the team dressage, eventing, and jumping competitions through a top-six finish in dressage and top-five in jumping at the 2022 FEI World Championships in Herning, Denmark and through a top-seven finish at the Eventing Worlds in the same year in Pratoni del Vivaro, Italy.

Dressage

Eventing

Jumping

Gymnastics

Artistic
Great Britain fielded a full squad of ten artistic gymnasts for Paris after achieving top-three finishes in both the men's and women's team all-around competitions at the 2022 World Championships in Liverpool.

Men
Team

Women
Team

Shooting

British shooters achieved quota places for the following events based on their results at the 2022 and 2023 ISSF World Championships, 2022, 2023, and 2024 European Championships, 2023 European Games, and 2024 ISSF World Olympic Qualification Tournament, if they obtained a minimum qualifying score (MQS) from 14 August 2022 to 9 June 2024.

Swimming 

British swimmers achieved the entry standards in the following events for Paris 2024 (a maximum of two swimmers under the Olympic Qualifying Time (OST) and potentially at the Olympic Consideration Time (OCT)):

Triathlon

Great Britain confirmed four quota places (two per gender) in the triathlon events for Paris, after finishing second behind the host nation France at the 2022 Mixed Relay World Championships in Montreal, Canada.

Individual

Relay

See also
Great Britain at the Olympics
Great Britain at the 2024 Summer Paralympics

References

Nations at the 2024 Summer Olympics
2024
2024 in British sport